The Vulcănița is a right tributary of the river Homorod in Romania. It discharges into the Homorod near Hălchiu.

References

Rivers of Romania
Rivers of Brașov County